Free Crack 3 is the third mixtape by American hip hop recording artist Lil Bibby.

Background
Free Crack 3 is the third and final mixtape of the Free Crack series. A follow-up to the series, FC3: The Epilogue, has since been announced.

The mixtape features guest appearances from Lil Herb, Future, Common, R. Kelly, Jeremih, among others. The production was handled by Metro Boomin, Southside, and Young Chop, among others.

Singles 
Free Crack 3 was supported by one single, "Word Around Town".

Critical response
Pitchfork noted that "as he expands his range of guests, his lyrical ability leveled up significantly" and that "Bibby has found success mostly by sticking to the program that got him here: consistent quality".

Vibe noted that "on FC3, Bibby keeps his authentic momentum moving forward" and that "Since arriving on the hip-hop scene, Bibby has consistently proven that he has a promising career ahead of him with his profound reality raps and steady supply of music".

Track list

References

2015 mixtape albums
Lil Bibby albums
Albums produced by C-Sick
Albums produced by Da Internz
Albums produced by Jake One
Albums produced by Metro Boomin
Albums produced by Southside (record producer)
Albums produced by Young Chop
Sequel albums